Adam Logan (born 1975 in Kingston, Ontario) is a research mathematician and a top Canadian Scrabble player. He won the World Scrabble Championship in 2005, beating Pakorn Nemitrmansuk of Thailand 3–0 in the final. He is the only player to have won the Canadian Scrabble Championship five times (1996, 2005, 2008, 2013 and 2016). He was also the winner of the 1996 National Scrabble Championship, North America's top rated player in 1997, and the winner of the Collins division of the 2014 North American Scrabble Championship.

Since his competitive career began in 1985, Logan has played nearly 2200 tournament games, compiling a winning percentage of over 68%, and earning just $100,000 in prize money.

He was a Putnam Fellow in 1992 and 1993. Logan completed his first degree, in mathematics, at Princeton University in 1995 and received a PhD from Harvard University in 1999. He completed his Post-doctoral work at McGill University between 2002 through 2003. From 2008 to 2009 he was employed as a Quantitative Analyst at D. E. Shaw & Co. in New York City.
He works for the Tutte Institute for Mathematics and Computing in Ottawa, Ontario, Canada.

References

External links

Adam Logan's NSA player profile
Adam Logan's professional home page (legacy; no longer in this position)

1975 births
Living people
Canadian mathematicians
Canadian Scrabble players
Harvard University alumni
Number theorists
Scientists from Ontario
Sportspeople from Kingston, Ontario
Princeton University alumni
World Scrabble Championship winners
International Mathematical Olympiad participants
Lisgar Collegiate Institute alumni
Putnam Fellows